The 2010 Liga de Voleibol Superior Femenino was the 42nd official season of Liga de Voleibol Superior Femenino (English: Female Superior Volleyball League). The 2010 season was dedicated to Miguel Ángel Nazario Gotay.

Competing Teams

Regular season

Regular Season Awards 
Athletes awarded at "Values of th Year Gala", April 24, 2010 in Isla Verde, Puerto Rico.

Individual awards

Voting Awards 
 Most Valuable Player
 Oneida González Lancheras de Cataño
 Best Setter
 Courtney Thompson Lancheras de Cataño
 More Progress Player
 Stephanie Enright Criollas de Caguas
 Comeback Player of the Year
 Shannon Torregrosa Lancheras de Cataño
 Rookie of the Year
 Bianca Rivera Vaqueras de Bayamón
 Coach Of the Year
 Milton Crespo Lancheras de Cataño
 Chairman Of the Year
 William López Lancheras de Cataño
 Referee of the Year
 Juan Carlos Juarbe

Statistics Awards 
 Best Receiver
 Xaimara Colón Gigantes de Carolina
 Best Digger
 Xaimara Colón Gigantes de Carolina
 Best Libero
 Xaimara Colón Gigantes de Carolina
 Best Scorer
 Oneida González Lancheras de Cataño
 Best Spiker
 Oneida González Lancheras de Cataño
 Best Blocker
 Jessica Jones Gigantes de Carolina
 Best Server
 Nellie Spicer Leonas de Ponce
 Best Setter
 Karla Echenique Gigantes de Carolina

2010 All-Stars Team

2010 Offensive Team

All Star Game

Results 
 Sunday March 21, 2010. Coliseum Héctor Solá Bezares, Caguas, Puerto Rico

Teams

Nativas (Natives) 
Head coach:  Juan Carlos Núñez

Importadas (Foreigners) 
Head coach:  Humberto Rodríguez

All-Star Game Most Valuable Player 
  Courtney Thompson Lancheras de Cataño

Quarter finals

Group A

Group B

Semifinals

Group A

Group B

Final

Best of 7 Series 
The 2010 Final series were played at the Roberto Clemente Coliseum, San Juan, Puerto Rico.

Game 1 
May 6, 2010

|}

Game 2 
May 8, 2010

|}

Game 3 
May 10, 2010

|}

Game 4 
May 12, 2010

|}

Awards 
 Final Series Most Valuable Player
 Destinee Hooker Pinkin de Corozal

References

External links 
 League Website

PUR
LVSF2010
2010 in Puerto Rican sports